Paul Hazel (born May 4, 1990) is a Canadian football defensive end who is currently a free agent. He was most recently a member of the Ottawa Redblacks of the Canadian Football League (CFL). He played college football at Western Michigan where he played 49 games with 19 starts and posted 104 tackles, 24 tackles for loss, 17.5 sacks, seven forced fumbles, and one fumble recovery. 

He has one son and is single.

Professional career

NFL 
Unselected in the 2013 NFL Draft, Hazel first signed with the Jacksonville Jaguars. After being waived, he was claimed by the Cleveland Browns  He signed with the Houston Texans after becoming a free agent at the end of the 2013 season.

CFL 
On June 1, 2015, the Hamilton Tiger-Cats of the Canadian Football League announced the signing of Paul Hazel at the beginning of their training camp. On June 21, 2015, he was released by the Tiger-Cats.

Hazel signed with the Ottawa Redblacks on July 28, 2016. Hazel played in 4 games for the Redblacks in 2016, recording 2 defensive tackles. He was released by the Redblacks on May 1, 2017 as they trimmed their roster down to 75 players in preparation for the 2017 season.

References

External links 
 Cleveland Browns bio
 Jacksonville Jaguars bio

1990 births
Living people
American football linebackers
Western Michigan Broncos football players
Jacksonville Jaguars players
Cleveland Browns players
Houston Texans players
New York Giants players
Ottawa Redblacks players
Canadian football defensive linemen
American players of Canadian football